Elective mutism is an outdated term which was defined as a refusal to speak in almost all social situations (despite normal ability to do so), while selective mutism was considered to be a failure to speak in specific situations and is strongly associated with social anxiety disorder.  In contrast to selective mutism, it was thought someone who was electively mute may not speak in any situation, as is usually shown in books and films.  Elective mutism was often attributed to defiance or the effect of trauma. Those who are able to speak freely in some situations but not in others are now better described by selective mutism.

History
In 1877, a German physician named the disorder aphasia voluntaria to describe children who were able to speak normally but often "refused" to.

In 1980, a study by Torey Hayden identified four "subtypes" of Elective Mutism:
Symbiotic mutism: the most common of the forms, caused by a vocal and dominating mother and absent father (very rarely the other way around) and characterized by the use of mutism as controlling behavior around other adults.
Speech phobic mutism: the least common, in which the child showed distinct fear at hearing a recording of their voice.  This also involved ritualistic behaviors, which may reflect OCD, and was thought to be caused by the child having been told to keep a family secret.
Reactive mutism: a reaction to trauma and/or abuse, with all children showing symptoms of depression and being notably withdrawn, usually showing no facial expressions.  Notably, Hayden admits that some children put in this category had no apparent incident to react to, but they were included because of their symptoms.
Passive-aggressive mutism: silence is used as a display of hostility, connected to antisocial behavior.  Some of the children in her study had reportedly not been mute until age 9–12.

The Diagnostic and Statistical Manual of Mental Disorders (DSM), first published in 1952, first included Elective Mutism in its third edition, published in 1980.  Elective mutism was described as "a continuous refusal to speak in almost all social situations" despite normal ability to speak.  While "excessive shyness" and other anxiety-related traits were listed as associated features, predisposing factors included "maternal overprotection", intellectual disability, and trauma.  Elective mutism in the third edition revised (DSM III-R) is described similarly as in the third edition except for specifying that the disorder is not related to social anxiety disorder.

In 1994, the fourth edition of the DSM reflected the name change to selective mutism and redefined the disorder.

Cultural references

Though elective mutism is no longer recognized by most psychiatrists, it is a popular character element or plot point in stories and movies.  Many characters choose to stop speaking, for various reasons.  Even more commonly, there are also characters who stop speaking after a traumatic incident.  In both these cases, often, and almost always in the second, the character is silent in all situations.  This is therefore not selective mutism, and anxiety is very rarely involved. Selective mutism itself is almost nonexistent in pop culture.

The following are a few references to stories including a character who does not speak despite being physically able to.
 In the book "Ice" by V.C. Andrews, a teacher of the main character, Ice, is concerned that she is an elective mute.
 In the book Cut by Patricia McCormick, the main character, Callie, is an elective mute.
 In The House of the Spirits by Isabel Allende, Clara Trueba is mute after witnessing her sisters molestation and autopsy. "She could not move until the first lights of dawn appeared. Only then did she slip back into her bed, feeling within her the silence of the entire world. Silence filled her utterly."
In Hannibal Rising by Thomas Harris, Hannibal Lecter is mute after witnessing his sister killed and eaten.
 In the book Flying Solo, the character Rachel is mute for six months after a classmate dies.
 In The Piano, Ada is an elective mute. She chooses to learn to speak at the end of the film.
 In the 1993 movie, House of Cards, Sally Matthews chooses not to speak after her father dies.
 In the book Halo: Ghosts of Onyx, Lucy-B091 is mute after she is one of only two survivors from her unit of 300.
 In the movie The Prophet Kamila's daughter, Elmitra, is depicted as mute after the death of her father.
 In the 2014 video game Watch Dogs, Aiden Pearce's nephew, Jackson, is electively mute after the death of his sister.
 In the book Fifty Shades of Grey, Christian Grey is depicted as having been an elective mute from age 4, when he witnessed his birth mother's drug overdose and death and was with her body for days before being discovered, until he was 6 years old and he spoke his newly adopted baby sister's name.
 In John Green's narrative YouTube series Swindon Town Swoodilypoopers, midfielder Maric Maric is selectively mute.
 In A Good Woman Is Hard to Find, Ben Collins stops speaking after witnessing his father being knifed to death.
 In the season 7 episode of Little House on the Prairie "The Silent Cry", one of the two brothers is depicted as an elective mute, much of the story revolving around the issues with adopting him due to not speaking.

References

Anxiety disorders
Mental disorders diagnosed in childhood
 
Muteness